Lokomotīve Daugavpils, also known as Lokomotiv Daugavpils, is a Latvian motorcycle speedway team based in Daugavpils who race in the Polish Speedway Second League (2. Liga).

Stadium 
Stadium Lokomotīve (former name Spīdveja centrs) is located at Jelgavas iela 54, Daugavpils. Its capacity is 10,000 seats. The track is 373 metres long and has a granite surface. The track record was set by Grigory Laguta (66.01 sec on 30 May 2010).

History
The team twice won the 1. Liga in 2015 and 2016 but were not promoted to the Ekstraliga, which was restricted to Polish clubs. 

During the 2020 Polish speedway season the club were relegated to 2. Liga.

Teams

2023 team
 Nick Morris
 Gustav Grahn
 Kevin Juhl Pedersen
 Steve Worrall
 Sam Jensen
 Justin Sedgmen
 Jevgeņijs Kostigovs
 Daniils Kolodinskis
 Časts Puodžuks
 Ričards Ansviesulis

Previous teams

2022 team

 Nick Morris
 Victor Palovaara
 Adam Ellis
 Kevin Juhl Pedersen
 Jevgeņijs Kostigovs
 Daniils Kolodinskis
 Ričards Ansviesulis

Honours

Season by season record

Russia

Poland

Team name changes
Iskra Daugavpils: 1964
Lokomotiv Daugavpils: 1966–1993
Daugavpils Speedway–Center: 2003–2004
Daugavpils Speedway: 2005
Daugavpils Speedway Center (Daugavpils Spīdveja centrs): 2006
Lokomotiv Daugavpils (Daugavpils Lokomotīve): 2007–present

See also 
 Speedway Grand Prix of Latvia
 Sport in Latvia
 Speedway in Poland

References

External links 
(lv) www.LatvijasSpidvejs.lv – Official website
 (ru) www.SokolRacing.lv – Speedway website

Sports teams in Latvia
Sport in Daugavpils
Polish speedway teams